Neoguri is the Korean word for Raccoon dog. It may also refer to:

 Typhoon Neoguri (disambiguation)
 Neoguri (instant noodle)